Harpalus gregoryi is a species of ground beetle in the subfamily Harpalinae. It was described by Alluaud in 1917.

References

gregoryi
Beetles described in 1917